Azzaro is a surname. Notable people with the surname include:

Erminio Azzaro (born 1948), Italian high jumper
Leonardo Azzaro (born 1978), Italian tennis player
Loris Azzaro (1933–2003), French fashion designer
Mike Azzaro, American polo player

See also
Azzaro (perfume)